The liquidus temperature, TL or Tliq, specifies the temperature above which a material is completely liquid, and the maximum temperature at which crystals can co-exist with the melt in thermodynamic equilibrium. It is mostly used for impure substances (mixtures) such as  glasses, alloys and rocks.

Above the liquidus temperature the material is homogeneous and liquid at equilibrium. Below the liquidus temperature, more and more crystals will form in the melt if one waits a sufficiently long time, depending on the material. Alternately, homogeneous glasses can be obtained through sufficiently fast cooling, i.e., through kinetic inhibition of the crystallization process.

The crystal phase that crystallizes first on cooling a substance to its liquidus temperature is termed primary crystalline phase or primary phase. The composition range within which the primary phase remains constant is known as primary crystalline phase field.

The liquidus temperature is important in the glass industry because crystallization can cause severe problems during the glass melting and forming processes, and it also may lead to product failure.

The liquidus temperature can be contrasted to the solidus temperature. The solidus temperature quantifies the point at which a material completely solidifies (crystallizes). The liquidus and solidus temperatures do not necessarily coincide; if a gap exists between the liquidus and solidus temperatures, then within that gap, the material consists of solid and liquid phases simultaneously (like a slurry).

For pure elements or compounds, e.g. pure copper, pure water, etc. and for eutectic mixtures the liquidus and solidus are at the same temperature, and the term "melting point" may be used. For impure substances, e.g. alloys, honey, soft drink, ice cream, etc. the melting point broadens into a melting interval instead. If the temperature is within the melting interval, one may see "slurries" at equilibrium, i.e. the slurry will neither fully solidify nor melt. This is why new snow of high purity on mountain peaks either melts or stays solid, while dirty snow on the ground in cities tends to become slushy at certain temperatures. Weld melt pools containing high levels of sulfur, either from melted impurities of the base metal or from the welding electrode, typically have very broad melting intervals, which leads to increased risk of hot cracking.

See also
 Freezing point
 Melting point
 Phase diagram
 Solidus

References

Glass chemistry
Glass engineering and science
Glass physics
Materials science
Metallurgy
Phase transitions
Threshold temperatures